Ancornallis cristatus is a species of beetle in the family Cerambycidae, and the only species in the genus Ancornallis. It was described by Fisher in 1935. The species is found only on the island of Borneo.

References

Apomecynini
Beetles described in 1935
Monotypic Cerambycidae genera